Srđan Grabež (born 2 April 1991) is a Serbian footballer who plays as a left-back for Javor Ivanjica.

Club career
He started his career with Mladost Apatin in the Serbian First League. In July 2010, he was transferred to Slovak side Dubnica.

In February 2013, Grabež joined Spartak Trnava. He made his league debut for them against Nitra on 2 March 2013.

In summer 2016 he returned to Serbia and joined Bratstvo Prigrevica playing in third level, Serbian League Belgrade.

On 18 August 2021, he signed a two-year contract with Javor Ivanjica after his transfer to Romanian club Miercurea Ciuc fell through.

References

External links
 

1991 births
Living people
People from Apatin
Serbian footballers
Serbian expatriate footballers
Association football midfielders
FK Mladost Apatin players
FK Dubnica players
FC Spartak Trnava players
OFK Bačka players
FK TSC Bačka Topola players
FK Javor Ivanjica players
Slovak Super Liga players
2. Liga (Slovakia) players
Serbian SuperLiga players
Serbian First League players
Expatriate footballers in Slovakia
Serbian expatriate sportspeople in Slovakia